The 1985–86 Boise State Broncos men's basketball team represented Boise State University during the 1985–86 NCAA Division I men's basketball season. The Broncos were led by third-year head coach Bobby Dye and played their home games on campus at the BSU Pavilion in Boise, Idaho.

In the conference tournament in Reno, Nevada, the fifth-seeded Broncos were defeated at the buzzer by Weber State in the quarterfinal

Postseason result

|-
!colspan=6 style=| Big Sky tournament

References

External links
Sports Reference – Boise State Broncos – 1985–86 basketball season

Boise State Broncos men's basketball seasons
Boise State
Boise State